Samoa Adventist College is a coeducational Christian school in Lalovaea, Samoa, established in  1978. It has a kindergarten class specifically for children under 6 years old, and a primary school for children from 6 to 13 years of age, as well as classes from Year 9 to Year 13. In 2019, Tepora Ta'ala Fuimaono, former Head of the Science Department and one of the longest serving teachers of the school, was appointed as the principal, succeeding Eteuati Koria.

See also

List of Seventh-day Adventist secondary schools

References

External links
Samoa Adventist College - Adventist Yearbook

SAC
SAC
Tuamasaga
Secondary schools affiliated with the Seventh-day Adventist Church